Stipe Brnas (born September 26, 1969) is a Croatian retired football defender, who currently is a coach at the NK Trnje academy.

Honours
 Austrian Cup winner: 2000-01
 Austrian Football First League winner: 2000-01

References

External links
 

1969 births
Living people
People from Split-Dalmatia County
Association football defenders
Croatian footballers
NK Inter Zaprešić players
HNK Segesta players
Grazer AK players
FC Kärnten players
NK Hrvatski Dragovoljac players
1. FC Saarbrücken players
NK Zagreb players
Croatian expatriate footballers
Expatriate footballers in Austria
Croatian expatriate sportspeople in Austria
Expatriate footballers in Germany
Croatian expatriate sportspeople in Germany
Croatian football managers
NK Rudeš managers
HAŠK managers